Ligand-dependent corepressor is a protein that in humans is encoded by the LCOR gene.

Function 

LCOR is a transcriptional corepressor widely expressed in fetal and adult tissues that is recruited to agonist-bound nuclear receptors through a single LxxLL motif, also referred to as a nuclear receptor (NR) box.

References

Further reading

External links 
 PDBe-KB provides an overview of all the structure information available in the PDB for Human Ligand-dependent corepressor

Transcription coregulators